Senator Corman may refer to:

Doyle Corman (1932–2019), Pennsylvania State Senate
Jake Corman (born 1964), Pennsylvania State Senate
Randy Corman (born 1960s), New Jersey State Senate